This is a list of Chetnik voivodes. Voivode (Old Slavic, literally "war-leader" or "war-lord") is a Slavic as well as Romanian title that originally denoted the principal commander of a military force. It derives from the word vojevoda, which in early Slavic meant the bellidux, i.e. the military commander of an area, but it usually had a greater meaning. Among the first modern-day voivodes was Kole Rašić, a late 19th-century Serb revolutionary and guerrilla fighter, who led a cheta of 300 men between Niš and Leskovac in Ottoman areas during the Serbo-Turkish War (1876–1878). The others were Rista Cvetković-Božinče, Čerkez Ilija, Čakr-paša, and Spiro Crne. Jovan Hadži-Vasiljević, who knew Spiro Crne personally, wrote and published his biography, Spiro Crne Golemdžiojski, in 1933.

Commanders of Old Serbia and Macedonia (1903–1912), Balkan Wars

 Kosta Milovanović-Pećanac (1904)
 Jovan Stojković-Babunski (1905)
 Vojislav Tankosić-Voja (1905)
 Lazar Kujundžić-Klempa (1905)
 Pavle Mladenović-Čiča (1905)
 Ljuba Jezdić-Razvigora (1905)
 Aksentije Bacetović-Baceta (1905)
 Savatije Milošević (1905)
 Borko Paštrović (1905)
 Doksim Mihailović (1905)
 Ilija Jovanović-Pčinjski (1905)
 Jovan Dovezenski
 Vojin Popović-Vuk
 Svetozar Ranković-Toza
 Trajko Mitrović-Koporan Čauš
 Jovan Cvetković-Dolgač
 Zafir Premčević
 Stojan Simonović-Koruba
 Krsta Kovačević-Trgoviški
 Trenko Rujanović
 Spasa Pavlović-Garda
 Rista Cvetković-Božinče
 Đorđe Cvetković
 Janićije Mićić
 Petko Ilić
 Rade Radivojević-Dušan
 Dragoljub Nikolić
 Rista Starački
 Jovan Pešić
 Ilija Trifunović-Birčanin
 Đorđe Ristić-Skopljanče
 Anđelko Stanković
 Vladimir Kovačević
 Jovan Grković-Gapon
 Vanđel Dimitrijević-Skopljanče
 Aleksandar Blagojević
 Dragiša Kovačević
 Dušan Dimitrijević-Dule
 Stevan Nedić-Ćela
 Todor Krstić-Algunjski
 Branivoje Jovanović-Brana
 Milan Vasić
 Milan Vidojević
 Pavle Blažarić
 Aleksa Komnenić-Hercegovac
 Sreten Rajković-Rudnički
 Panta Radosavljević
 Veličko Domorovski
 Rista Maksimović-Giljanče
 Vukajlo Božović-Prota
 Milivoje Dinić
 Tasa Donić-Smederevac
 Milutin Babović-Telegraph
 Petar Mitrozić
 Milutin Ivanović
 Vasilije Trbić
 Vojvoda Dragomir is Dragomir Protić
 Bogdan Jugović Hajnc
 Radoje Pantić
 Milorad Pavićević
 Milosav Jelić
 Dušan Jezdić
 Nikola Skadarac (1908)
 Petar Koćura (1908)
 Micko Krstić
 Andjelko Krstić
 Bogdan Radenković
 Jovan Naumović-Vojvoda Osogovski
 Jovan Ćirković
 Luka Ćelović
 Milorad Gođevac
 Nikola Spasić
 Ljubomir Kovačević
 Vasa Jovanović
 Vlada Voskar
 Sreten Vukosavljević
 Petar Kacarević
 Živko Gvozdić
 Vukajlo Božović
 Dejan Popović Jekić
 Ljubomir Vulović
 Ljuba Čupa
 Dane Stojanović
 Tasa Konević
 Trenko Rujanović
 Boško Virjanac
 Mihailo "Mikajle" Josifović
 Sava Petrović-Grmija
 Velimir Prelić
 Simo Kecojević
 Jovan Hadži-Vasiljević
 Toma Smiljanić-Bradina
 Stevan Simić
 Mihailo Petrović (Chetnik)
 Velimir Karić
 Alimpije Marjanovic
 Emilio Milutinović
 Dragoljub Džilić-Stric
 Vidosav Marjanović
 Strašimir Miletić
 Jovan Arandjelović
 Dušan Kalčić
 Žika Rafailović
 Denko Čuma
 Dragoljub Urošević-Podrinac
 Smail Smajo Ferovic

Balkan Wars & World War I
 Milija and Pavle Bakić
 Stanislav Krakov
 Uroš Kostić-Rudinac
 Ilija Trifunović (1916; fighting in Old Serbia during German, Austrian and Bulgarian occupation)
 Vojin Popović (1916)
 Kosta Vojinović (1916)
 Puniša Račić (1916)
 Mustafa Golubić
 Milivoje M. Naumović

World War II

Yugoslav Army in the Fatherland

 Draža Mihailović (1893–1946), supreme commander, vojvoda of the Chetnik Detachments of the Yugoslav Army.
  (1894–1945), Yugoslav brigadier general, vojvoda šumadijski (Voivode of Šumadija).
 Dragoslav Račić (1905–1945), Yugoslav captain, vojvoda pocerski (Voivode of Pocerina).
 Nikola Kalabić (1906–1946), Yugoslav lieutenant, vojvoda oplenački (Voivode of Oplenac).
 Dragutin Keserović (1896–1945), Yugoslav major, vojvoda kopaonički (Voivode of Kopaonik).
 Zvonimir Vučković (1916–2004), Yugoslav lieutenant, vojvoda takovski (Voivode of Takovo).
 Predrag Raković (1912–1944), Yugoslav lieutenant, vojvoda ljubićki (Voivode of Ljubić).
 Dušan Smiljanić, Yugoslav captain, vojvoda gružanski (Voivode of Gruža).
  (1907–1945), Yugoslav major, vojvoda avalski (Voivode of Avala).
  (1913–1944), Yugoslav sublieutenant, vojvoda dragačevski (Voivode of Dragačevo).
 Velimir Piletić (1906–1972), Yugoslav major, vojvoda krajinski (Voivode of the Timok Valley).
 , Yugoslav lieutenant, vojvoda valjevski (Voivode of Valjevo).
  (1892–1986), vojvoda od Ludmera (Voivode of Ludmer).
 Uroš Drenović (1911–1944), Yugoslav lieutenant, vojvoda in Bosnia.
 Petar Baćović (1898–1945), Yugoslav major, vojvoda kalinovički (Voivode of Kalinovik). Named in July 1942.
 Petar Samardžić, vojvoda in Herzegovina.
  (1906–1946), vojvoda in Herzegovina. Named by Birčanin in 1942.
 Radojica Perišić (1906–1945), Orthodox priest, vojvoda in Golija.
 Mirko Marić
 Branko Bogunović
 Danilo Stanisavljević nicknamed Dane Cicvara (1917-1942) - voivode of Lika and Kordun
 Mane Rokvić (d. 1944).
 Vlada Novaković
 Karl Novak (1905–1975), Yugoslav captain, vojvoda in Slovenia.
 Pavle Đurišić (1909–1945), Yugoslav captain, vojvoda durmitorski (Voivode of Durmitor). Named in December 1941.
 Bajo Stanišić (1890–1943), Yugoslav colonel, vojvoda in Montenegro.
 Blažo Đukanović (1883–1943), Yugoslav brigadier general, vojvoda in Montenegro.
  (1910–2007), Yugoslav major, vojvoda in Montenegro. Named in July 1944.
 Miljan Anđušić (1895–1946), Yugoslav captain, vojvoda Zetski i Skenderijski.
 Novak Anđušić (1901–1943), vojvoda in Montenegro. Named by Voivode M. Anđušić in May 1941.
 Miloš Radoman (1903–1943), vojvoda in Montenegro.
 Blago Ajković (1899–1943), vojvoda in Montenegro. Self-styled.
 Vojislav Lukačević (1908–1945), vojvoda in Raška.
 Zaharije Ostojić (1907–1945), general command.
 Radovan Ivanišević, vojvoda dinarski (Voivode of the Dinara). Named by Birčanin.

Other
 Kosta Pećanac (1879–1944), vojvoda of the Pećanac Chetniks. Named during the Macedonian Struggle.
 Momčilo Đujić (1907–1999), vojvoda of the Dinara Division. Named by King Peter II in 1942.
 Dobroslav Jevđević (1895–1962), vojvoda of Herzegovina Chetniks. Self-appointed.
 Stojan Krstić, commander of the Vardar Chetnik Corps. Named in 1943.
 Aleksandar Janković (1921-2019) voivoda of Fruska Gora, Royal Yugoslav Army Air Force pilot, named in 1942 by Kosta Milovanović Pećanac
 Ilija Trifunović-Birčanin. Named during the Macedonian Struggle.
 Dragoslav Račić (1905–1945), Yugoslav colonel.
 Jezdimir Dangić, Yugoslav major.
 Dragiša Vasić (1885–1945), Yugoslav reserve officer.
 Aćim Babić, vojvoda in East Bosnia. Self-styled.

Yugoslav Wars

By Momčilo Đujić
 Vojislav Šešelj - named by Momčilo Đujić on June 28, 1989
 Rade Čubrilo - named by Momčilo Đujić in 1993

By Vojislav Šešelj
On 13 May 1993:

 Zdravko Abramović
 Branislav Vakić.
 Srećko Radovanović.
 Slavko Crnić
 Nedeljko Vidaković.
 Slavko Aleksić (b. 1956), VRS commander of New Sarajevo Detachment.
  "Manda" (1963–2002), VRS commander of the Majevica Lions.
 Miroslav Vuković "Ćele".
 Milika Dačević "Čeko".
 Tomislav Nikolić, SRS politician.
 Milan Lančužanin "Kameni".
 Zoran Dražilović "Čiča". 
 Jovo Ostojić.
 Ljubiša Petković.
 Todor Lazić.
  (b. 1956), SRS RS politician.
 Dragan Cvetković. 
 Branislav Gavrilović "Brne", Šešelj's bodyguard.

On 20 March 1994:
 Vasilije Vidović "Vaske", Šešelj's bodyguard.
  (1961–1998), VRS commander of the Bileća Volunteers.
 Nikola Poplašen, politician.
 Mujo Bunjaku alias Oliver Denis Baret (d. 1994), Šešelj's bodyguard.
 Rade Čubrilo, commander of TO Medak.
 Miodrag Tripković.

Named after Yugoslav Wars
 Miodrag Božović - named by Milo Rakočević in 2007
 Andrija Mandić, Montenegrin Serb politician. Named by Milo Rakočević in 2007
 Uroš Šušterič, World War II veteran. Named by Milo Rakočević in 2007.

References

External links
 
 

Chetniks